Ethics in Progress a Polish open access peer-reviewed academic journal devoted to ethics and philosophy, published electronically, mainly in English.

The journal is devoted to ethical issues, especially empirical research of ethical problems, experimental ethics, moral competence.

The founder of the journal is Professor Ewa Nowak, Ph.D., head of the Department of Ethics at the Faculty of Philosophy of Adam Mickiewicz University in Poznań.

Ethics in Progress has been published since 2010. It publishes primarily texts in English, but also in Polish, German and Italian. Scientific articles published in the journal are reviewed in a double-blind system and subjected to anti-plagiarism control.

The journal has implemented COPE (Committee on Publication Ethics) publishing standards, uses digital identifiers for electronic documents (DOI, Digital Object Identifier) and incorporates unique identifiers of researchers (ORCID numbers) into its activities.

The journal was on the ministerial list of scored journals, with a score of 7 for 2016, 2017, 2018. In 2019, 2020 and 2021, the journal is on the ministerial list of scored journals, with a score of 40.

The journal is indexed in SCOPUS, listed on Directory of Open Access Journals, and on SHERPA/RoMEO journal policy database. Articles from this journal are available in the Google Scholar service.

Ethics in Progress is listed on the Polish Wikipedia page. 

Article by Malgorzata Bogaczyk-Vormayr "Art brut oder die Überwindung der Biomacht" published in Ethics in Progress is mentioned in Tageblatt Lëtzebuerg.  

The editorial team consists of Ewa Nowak, Tomasz Raburski, Georg Lind, Jason Matzke, Roma Kriauciuniene, Roberto Franzini Tibaldeo, Joanna Dutka, Alicja Skrzypczak, Marcin Jan Byczyński, Sara Sgarlata and Noemi Sgarlata.

See also 
 List of ethics journals
 List of philosophy journals

References

External links 
 

Adam Mickiewicz University in Poznań
Biannual journals
English-language journals
Ethics journals
Humanist literature
Publications established in 2010